People v. Saephanh, 80 Cal. App. 4th 451, 94 Cal. Rptr. 910 (2001), is a United States criminal case in which it was determined that solicitation of another person to commit a crime can occur even if the solicitation is never communicated to that person. Saephanh conceived a child with a woman, was imprisoned, and from prison wrote a letter soliciting another person to attack the woman to terminate the pregnancy. The letter was intercepted by a prison official before it was delivered. The court held that solicitation did not occur, but that "attempted solicitation" did, even though this was a doubly inchoate crime (i.e., neither the attack nor the communication actually occurred).

Notes

References

External links

2001 in United States case law
California state case law
U.S. state criminal case law